WAEV (97.3 FM, "97.3 Kiss FM") is a commercial radio station licensed to Savannah, Georgia. Owned by iHeartMedia, it broadcasts a contemporary hit radio format. WAEV's transmitter is located near Bloomingdale, Georgia, and shares studios with its sister stations in Garden City.

History
During the early- and mid-1970s, WXLM was an easy listening station. In September 1977, the station flipped to Album Rock in response to WTOC starting a highly successful overnight album rock program in 1976. Before this, Savannah had been without a rock station since WEAS-FM flipped in the early 1970s. 97.3 went by the name 97 Rock with the call sign WXLM. In 1980, the station flipped to Adult Contemporary known as WAEV ("Wave 97").

When WXLM left the air, Savannah did not have a rock station until WIXV picked up the format in 1986. The station evolved into a Hot AC station as Mix 97.3 in 1993.  After several years of falling numbers and revenue in the early 2000s, the station rebranded to Clear Channel's Top 40 Kiss FM format in December 2001. After several months of further format "tweaking", the station moved into a more mainstream mix of music than most other Kiss-branded stations.

External links

AEV
Contemporary hit radio stations in the United States
Radio stations established in 1976
1976 establishments in Georgia (U.S. state)
IHeartMedia radio stations